Eleanor Fried was a Russian Empire-born American film editor, business manager, and screenwriter who worked at Universal and MGM in the 1910s and 1920s. Like most editors of the early silent era, she didn't receive on-screen credit for her earliest efforts.

Biography 
Eleanor was born in Grodno, the Russian Empire (currently Belarus) in 1891. As a young girl, she immigrated to the New York City with her family. She began studying to become a lawyer after high school but instead found herself drawn to showbusiness.

She began her career as a film editor at Universal in New York before moving to Los Angeles to cut films alongside Frank Lawrence at Universal. At Universal, she worked for years as an editor and staff critic before getting a chance to write her own scripts and eventually become a business manager. She was signed to MGM's writing staff in 1926.

She was married to writer-director Scott Darling.

Selected filmography 

 Red Clay (1927) (editor)
 The Winged Rider (1926) (screenwriter)
 Colorado (1921) (screenwriter)
 As You Were (1920) (screenwriter)
 The Dragon's Net (1920) (screenwriter and editor)
 Blind Husbands (1919) (editor)

References 

American film editors
American women film editors
1891 births
1965 deaths
20th-century American screenwriters
20th-century American women
Emigrants from the Russian Empire to the United States